The Student of Salamanca (Spanish: El estudiante de Salamanca) is a work by Spanish Romantic poet José de Espronceda. It was published in fragments beginning in 1837; the complete poem was published in 1840 in the volume Poesías. Parts of it are poetry, other parts drama. It is a variation of the Don Juan legend, with its central character don Félix de Montemar playing the part of Don Juan.

Plot

Don Félix seduces Elvira, who dies of love for him after he leaves her. Her brother then comes to avenge her. Don Félix and the brother die in their duel. The work culminates in don Félix's descent into hell.

External links 
 Full text of the work can be found here

Spanish poems
1837 books
Works based on the Don Juan legend